Sardar Muhammad Sarfraz Dogar (born 3 July 1968) is a Pakistani jurist who has been Justice of the Lahore High Court since 8 June 2015.

References

1968 births
Living people
Judges of the Lahore High Court
Pakistani judges